The Siaogangshan Skywalk Park is a park in Gangshan District, Kaohsiung, Taiwan. The park is owned by Kaohsiung City Government.

History
The park was constructed with a budget of almost NT$100 million. It was opened on a trial basis on 4 February 2018 and was officially opened on 14 February 2018. On 3 December 2018 to 4 February 2019, the park was closed for drainage and road works for a total cost of NT$17 million.

Geology
The park spans over an area of 1.8 hectares and is located on a hilltop and overlooks the Agongdian Reservoir.

Architecture
The shape of the skywalk resembles a violin for its main pylon and strings for its 24 suspension cables.

Transportation
The park is accessible by bus from Gangshan South Station of Kaohsiung MRT.

See also
 List of parks in Taiwan

References

External links
  

2018 establishments in Taiwan
Parks established in 2018
Parks in Kaohsiung